The Manila Railway Dagupan class of 1890 were thirty 0-6-2 side tank locomotives. Thirty locomotives were built for the  Manila Railway Company between 1888 and 1890. They were the first true mainline locomotives in service of the Ferrocarril de Manila a Dagupan inter-city rail line, succeeding two of five Manila class light-duty locomotives. One of these locomotives, No. 17 Urdaneta, survives today on static display on an open-air museum in Dagupan, Pangasinan.

Background
The Luzon railroad system was originally proposed by Don Eduardo Lopez Navarro in 1875 and was approved by the Spanish East Indies government in 1880. The company's operations then went under the process of bidding for concessionaires, with the British-owned Manila Railway Company winning the franchising rights to the system and will be built in 3 ft 6 in (1,067 mm) narrow gauge to save costs.

During the construction of the line, light-duty Manila-class locomotives built by Hunslet Engine Company were used to carry passengers between Manila and Bulacan. Since the design was not suitable for long-distance travel, the British owners of the Manila Railway ordered several larger locomotives from Scottish manufacturers. Two manufacturers, Neilson and Company, and Dübs and Company; both based in Glasgow, won the orders for the locomotives. The class will be later known to Filipino railroad historians as the Dagupan class, after the northern terminus of the line.

Design
There were two identical designs for the Dagupan class. Fifteen units were built for each subclass, differentiated by its livery and smokestack.

Nielson A subclass

The first subclass was exemplified by Borrecon above and built by Neilson in 1888 was later classified by the Manila Railroad as the A subclass. Compared to the later B subclass, it did not have a bell on the front of the locomotive. It also featured a different smokestack. According to postage stamps recovered by University of the Philippines historian Leonardo Q. Liongson, the Neilson class was originally painted black, with the side tank colored either metallic silver or white, and with an azure lining.

Dübs B subclass
The second subclass' design is exemplified by Urdaneta, the only surviving unit. These were delivered to the Manila Railway in 1890 and was classified as the B subclass. It features a more complex design compared to the A-subclass, with a bell and one of its boilers had its whistle attached to the sandbox. The design of the smokestack was also larger than the previous type, with a different spark arrestor and a narrower exhaust from the smokebox. Some designs such as the one used on the Stotsenburg Unlimited also featured a simple smokestack design without a spark arrestor.

During their service with the Manila Railroad, the nameplate of named locomotives such as Urdaneta were removed and were replaced by the monogram of the Manila Railroad Company. To differentiate it from the A subclass, these locomotives were fully painted black except for a red-colored lining near the couplers.

Service
The Neilson A subclass entered test services on the North Main Line (then known as Ferrocarril de Manila a Dagupan) by  1888, while the B subclass entered service by 1890. Each opened section is also opened for the trains. During the Philippine–American War, these locomotives were used to carry United States Army troops towards the area of Central and Northern Luzon, chasing down the leaders of the Philippine Revolution such as Emilio Aguinaldo. One train was destroyed with the locomotive being partially damaged near Angeles City. Its status after the war was unknown.

During the beginning of the American colonial period, the locomotives served express trains such as the Stotsenburg Unlimited between Manila and Fort Stotsenburg in Pampanga. The Dagupan class became the primary locomotives in the 1900s and carried both passengers and freight. According to the Railroad Gazette, the first-class cars the locomotives carried had windows and seating while the third-class cars were boxcars that were supposedly used by freight trains.

Retirement
The arrival of larger tender locomotives from British and American manufacturers by the 1910s and the 1920s rendered the Dagupan class obsolete for flagship services. Along with the much-later 71-class that also featured the same 0-6-2 wheel configuration, they were relegated to switching duties in the 1920s.

Some locomotives remained in service for switching and short-line duties under the Manila Railroad and were fully repainted black to signify their service to the MRR. This was evident with No. 17 Urdaneta. According to Manila Railroad's mechanical superintendent F. Unson, three locomotives remained in service by 1947, almost 60 years after their original entry into service. They were then decommissioned alongside all steam locomotives starting on August 15, 1956 as Manila Railroad entered dieselization.

Preservation
After its retirement in 1956, No. 17 Urdaneta was given to the Franklin Baker Company of the Philippines plant in San Pablo, Laguna and serve there as a switcher until the rails were removed sometime after 1959. The locomotive was then returned to the Philippine National Railways and was initially displayed by in front of Tutuban station in Manila until it was transferred to Dagupan in 2005. The two other units that survived were then scrapped by 1963.

Accidents
SL No. 3 was involved in a fatal level crossing accident on June 23, 1937 in Binakayan, Cavite. The locomotive was hauling a work train when it hit United States Navy Mail Truck No. 1530. The protective barriers on the level crossing were also removed after its decommissioning months earlier, leading to the accident. Two people died and another two were in critical condition during the time of reporting.

References

Rolling stock of the Philippines
3 ft 6 in gauge locomotives
Railway locomotives introduced in 1888
0-6-2T locomotives
Neilson locomotives
Dübs locomotives